Antonio Amati ( –  1607) was an Italian luthier, active from 1560 to 1605.

Biography 
Born in Cremona, Andrea Amati's son and Girolamo Amati's brother, Antonio worked first with his father, then with his brother, in the same workshop. With the latter, he refined his construction technique and style. For about ten years, they co-signed their works with their Latinized names: "Antonius & Hieronymus Amati"

Instruments 
The instruments with the common label of Antonio and Girolamo can hardly be assigned to the individual brothers, even for experts. They worked extraordinarily cleanly and experimented on the construction of the violin, especially on the contours, vaults and f-holes. Characteristic is a recessed gorge, which is responsible for the warm tone of their exhibits.

See also 
 Giuseppe Guarneri
 Antonio Stradivari

Bibliography 
 William Henley's Universal Dictionary of Violin & Bow Makers, Brighton, Amati, 1973.
 Cacciatori, Fausto: Il DNA degli Amati, Cremona 2006, .
 Die Musik in Geschichte und Gegenwart (MGG2), Personenteil Vol. 1, Bärenreiter, Kassel 1999.
 Stefan Drees: Lexikon der Violine, Laaber-Verlag, Laaber 2004, .
 Walter Kolneder: Das Buch der Violine. Bau, Geschichte, Spiel, Pädagogik, Komposition. Atlantis Musikbuchverlag, Zürich 1993, .
 Philip J. Kass: The Stati D’Anime of S. Faustino in Cremona: Tracing the Amati Family 1641-1686, Violin Society of America, 1999.
 Philip J. Kass: Nicolo Amatl: His Life and Times, Journal of the Violin Society of America, 15-2. 1996.

External links 
 La famille Amati

Luthiers from Cremona
1540 births
1638 deaths
Bowed string instrument makers